Jurong Central Park is an 8-ha regional park.

Activities
Other activities such as participating in concerts and performances, family gatherings, inline skating is available.

See also
List of parks in Singapore

Getting there
The park is situated across Boon Lay MRT station. Cross over Boon Lay Way from Boon Lay MRT, Jurong Point and Boon Lay Bus Interchange and you will arrive at the park.

References

External links
National Parks Board
Jurong Central Park

Parks in Singapore
Pioneer, Singapore